The 1990 Pilkington Glass Championships was a women's tennis tournament played on grass courts at the Devonshire Park Lawn Tennis Club in Eastbourne in the United Kingdom that was part of Tier II of the 1990 WTA Tour. The tournament was held from 18 June until 24 June 1990. First-seeded Martina Navratilova won the singles title and earned $70,000 first-prize money.

Finals

Singles
 Martina Navratilova defeated  Gretchen Magers 6–0, 6–2
 It was Navratilova's fifth singles title of the year and the 139th of her career.

Doubles
 Larisa Savchenko-Neiland /  Natalia Zvereva defeated  Patty Fendick /  Zina Garrison 6–4, 6–3
 It was Savchenko-Neiland's second doubles title of the year and the 16th of her career. It was Zvereva's second doubles title of the year and the 9th of her career.

References

External links
 ITF tournament edition details
 Tournament draws

Pilkington Glass Championships
Eastbourne International
Pilkington Glass Championships
Pilkington Glass Championships
Pilkington